Mount Mueller is an ice-covered mountain standing close east of Mount Storegutt,  west of Edward VIll Bay in Enderby Land, Antarctica.

The mountain was mapped from aerial photos taken by the Australian National Antarctic Research Expeditions (ANARE) in 1956 and named in honor of F. von Mueller, a member of the Australian Antarctic Exploration Committee of 1886.

References

Mountains of Enderby Land